Elections to Barnsley Metropolitan Borough Council were held on 6 May 1976, with one third of council up for election. The election resulted in Labour retaining control of the council.

Election result

This resulted in the following composition of the council:

Ward results

+/- figures represent changes from the last time these wards were contested.

References

1976 English local elections
1976
1970s in South Yorkshire